Phulkharka was one of the village development committees in Dhading District of central Nepal. But since 2017 it lies in ward number 5 of  Ganga Jamuna Gaupalika (Rural Municipality) of Dhading District. This ward lies in northern part of district. In 2011, it had a population of around 4,125 with 920 households. Of 4,125 total population, women population was 2,356. Chhetree, Tamang, Gurung, Magar, Ghale, Kami, Brahmin, Damai, Sarki, Bhujel, Newar caste etc. live in this village. This village has famous Ganga Jamuna falls and Tinsure danda viewpoint. Phulkharka village is good source of freshwater which are currently used for drinking water, and irrigation. As listed below, there are 12 primary and secondary schools in this village:
 Mandali Higher Secondary School, Phulkharka
 Hile Pokhari Lower Secondary School, Shuka Bhanjyang
 Annapurna Primary School, Kalleri
 Saraswati Primary School, Majuwa
 Dhandkharka Primary School, Dhandkharka
 Sundar Primary School, Sadan
 Sitala Primary School, Phulkharka
 Jalkanya Primary School, Kattike
 Balauta Primary School, Lapsibot
 Kuwapani Primary School, Painyukharka
 Gangajamuna Primary School, Dangsing
 Kalika Primary School, Mahabhir

References

Populated places in Dhading District